Dubtonic Kru are a live reggae band from Jamaica. After earning the title "Best New Band in the World 2010 - 2011" at the Global Battle of the Bands international contest and many other achievements, they performed in Ostróda.

History

Formation and early years

Awards
In 2011, Dubtonic Kru was honoured by the United States House of Congress and was presented with a Congressional Proclamation by Congresswoman Yvette Clarke. They were awarded the Simba award by the Coalition to Preserve Reggae (CPR). These achievements amazed the Jamaican music industry and gave more credence to the recent revival of Jamaica's live music scene and a more rapid growth of bands coming to the fore.

Musical style

reggae

References

External links
 Official website
 Ostróda Reggae website
 Dubtonic Kru Honored by US Representative and Awarded the Simba Award
 Big up radio
 Dubtonic Kru receives award at 7th annual Reggae Culture Salute

Jamaican reggae musical groups